Abrus melanospermus is a species of flowering plant in the pea and bean family Fabaceae. It is native to Africa and Asia. It was also introduced to South America.

Ecology 
The species has an ecology in Miombo and sand woodlands in Kalahari.

Distribution 
The species is native to Angola, Bangladesh, Benin, Burkina Faso, Burundi, Cambodia, Cameroon, Central African Republic, Chad, China, Congo, East Himalaya, Equatorial Guinea, Ethiopia, Ghana, Guinea, Guinea-Bissau, India, Kenya, Laos, Liberia, Madagascar, Malawi, Malaysia, Mali, Mozambique, Myanmar, Nepal, Papua New Guinea, Nigeria, Philippines, Senegal, Sierra Leone, Sri Lanka, Sudan, Tanzania, Thailand, Togo, Uganda, Vietnam, Zambia, Zaïre.

Taxonomy 
It has three accepted Infraspecifics:
 Abrus melanospermus subsp. melanospermus occurs in Bangladesh, Cambodia, China, India, Laos, Malaysia, Myanmar, Nepal, Philippines, Sri Lanka, Thailand, and Vietnam.
 Abrus melanospermus subsp. tenuiflorus is native in 20+ African countries, and has been introduced into Bolivia, Brazil, Colombia and Venezuela.
 Abrus melanospermus subsp. suffruticosus is native in Angola, Burundi, Central African Republic, Chad, DR Congo, Congo Republic, Guinea-Bissau, Malawi, Mozambique, Nigeria, Senegal, Sierra Leone, Tanzania, Zambia and Zaïre.

References 

Faboideae